Samantha Strauss is an Australian screenwriter known for the shows Dance Academy and Nine Perfect Strangers.

Early life and family
Strauss grew up in Gold Coast, Queensland, and was educated at St Hilda's School, Trinity Lutheran College and Bond University, where she studied Film and Television. She also trained in professional ballet on the Gold Coast, before a fractured back injury forced her to change directions.

Screenwriting career
Samantha Strauss is the co-creator and head writer of the 65-part ABC teen drama series Dance Academy. In 2011 the series won the Australian Logie for Most Outstanding Children's Drama and was nominated for an International Emmy Award in the Children and Young People category.

Samantha has been commissioned to write B Model—a feature film produced by Louise Smith and Rachel Griffiths, with Griffiths slated to direct. Based on the novel by Miranda Darling, this project is still in development.

On 22 September 2020, See-Saw Films launched production company Picking Scabs jointly with Strauss.

She was a writer on the 2021 Hulu miniseries Nine Perfect Strangers, based on the novel by Australian writer Liane Moriarty.

Filmography
Dance Academy (writer, co-creator)
H2O: Just Add Water (writer)
The New Legends of Monkey (writer)
The Wrong Girl (writer)
Nine Perfect Strangers (writer)

References

External links

Living people
Australian screenwriters
Australian women television writers
Australian television writers
Australian television producers
Australian women television producers
Year of birth missing (living people)
People from the Gold Coast, Queensland